The 2020 ITTF World Tour was the 25th season of the International Table Tennis Federation's professional table tennis world tour.

The season was cut short due to the COVID-19 pandemic, with only three events having taken place. The ITTF World Tour Grand Finals were replaced by the 2020 ITTF Finals, a one-off event featuring the top-ranked male and female players, as part of the International Table Tennis Federation's #RESTART series of events in November 2020.

Points allocation

Schedule

The tournaments in the 2020 tour were split into two tiers: World Tour Platinum and World Tour. The Platinum events offered higher prize money and more points towards the ITTF World Tour standings, which would have determined the qualifiers for the ITTF World Tour Grand Finals in December. 

Below is the 2020 schedule announced by the International Table Tennis Federation:

Key

Results

Grand Finals

The 2020 ITTF World Tour Grand Finals were cancelled due to the COVID-19 pandemic. They were replaced by the 2020 ITTF Finals, an event featuring the highest-ranked male and female players, which took place in Zhengzhou, China, from 19 to 22 November 2020.

See also
2020 World Team Table Tennis Championships
2020 ITTF Men's World Cup
2020 ITTF Women's World Cup
2020 ITTF Challenge Series

References

External links
International Table Tennis Federation

 
ITTF World Tour
World Tour
ITTF World Tour